Esch is an Ortsgemeinde – a municipality belonging to a Verbandsgemeinde, a kind of collective municipality – in the Bernkastel-Wittlich district in Rhineland-Palatinate, Germany.

Geography 

The municipality lies in the southern Salm valley at the edge of the Moselle Mountains. It belongs to the Verbandsgemeinde of Wittlich-Land, whose seat is in Wittlich, although that town is itself not in the Verbandsgemeinde.

History 
In 1086, Esch had its first documented mention under the name Asche. In the 15th century, Esch was the residential seat of the Blessed Eberhard, who founded the pilgrimage village of Klausen. Beginning in 1794, Esch lay under French rule. In 1814 it was assigned to the Kingdom of Prussia at the Congress of Vienna. Since 1947, it has been part of the then newly founded state of Rhineland-Palatinate.

Politics

Municipal council 
The council is made up of 8 council members, who were elected by proportional representation at the municipal election held on 7 June 2009, and the honorary mayor as chairman.

The municipal election held on 7 June 2009 yielded the following results:

Coat of arms 
The German blazon reads: unter goldenem Schildhaupt einen wachsenden roten Löwen mit silber-blauer Eisenhutfeh

The municipality's arms might in English heraldic language be described thus: Vair proper, in a chief Or a demilion gules.

References

External links 
 Esch at the Eifel Club 
 Brief portrait of Esch with film at SWR Fernsehen 

Bernkastel-Wittlich